Michael Joseph Farrell Jr. (born February 6, 1939) is an American actor, best known for his role as Captain B.J. Hunnicutt on the television series M*A*S*H (1975–83). Farrell was a producer of Patch Adams (1998) starring Robin Williams, and starred in the television series Providence (1999–2002). He is also an activist and public speaker for various political causes.

Early life
Farrell, one of four children, was born in St. Paul, Minnesota, the son of Agnes Sarah Cosgrove and Michael Joseph Farrell.

When he was two years old, his family moved from South St. Paul to Hollywood, California, where his father worked as a carpenter on film sets. Farrell attended West Hollywood Grammar School in the same class as fellow actor Natalie Wood, and graduated from Hollywood High School. He served in the United States Marine Corps from 1957 to 1959. After being discharged, he worked at various jobs before becoming an actor.

Acting career

Early career

During the 1960s, Farrell guest-starred in a few series. Notable roles included playing a young US Forest Service ranger in the Lassie episode "Never Look Back" (February 1967), Federal Agent Modell in the episode "Monkee Chow Mein" on The Monkees in 1967; as a bellhop (uncredited) in The Graduate in 1967; astronaut Arland in the episode "Genie, Genie, Who's Got the Genie?" on I Dream of Jeannie; an Army doctor in the episode "The Bankroll" of Combat!; and an ex-high school friend turned famous actor of Chet Kincaid in The Bill Cosby Show.

In 1968, he originated the continuing role of Scott Banning in the NBC soap opera Days of Our Lives. In 1970, he starred as one of the young doctors in the CBS prime-time series The Interns, in a cast led by Broderick Crawford. In 1971, he played the assistant to Anthony Quinn in ABC's The Man and the City. In 1973, while under contract to Universal Studios, Farrell starred with Robert Foxworth in The Questor Tapes. During the years under contract, he guest-starred in a number of shows, including Banacek, Mannix, Marcus Welby, M.D.,  The Six Million Dollar Man and The New Land; and starred in a television pilot with Jane Wyman, which did not sell.

In the early 1970s, Farrell guest starred in the television western drama Bonanza and did a number of commercials as a spokesman for Maytag dryers and Plymouth automobiles among other products.

M*A*S*H (1975–83) and later roles
Farrell's big break came in 1975 when Wayne Rogers departed M*A*S*H at the end of the third season. Farrell was recruited for the newly created role of B.J. Hunnicutt, along with series lead Harry Morgan, who replaced McLean Stevenson, also at the end of the third season. Morgan had appeared as General Bartford Hamilton Steele in the season-three episode "The General Flipped at Dawn" (for which he won an Emmy Award for Best Guest Role in a Primetime Comedy Series). Farrell stayed with the series for its remaining eight years on the air. During that time, he wrote five episodes and directed four.

Since M*A*S*H, Farrell has guest-starred in Murder, She Wrote; Justice League; Desperate Housewives; and many others. Farrell voiced Jonathan Kent in Superman: The Animated Series (1996) with wife Shelley Fabares voicing Martha Kent.

Farrell hosted several National Geographic Presents specials and starred in a number of television films, including 1983's Memorial Day, which he co-produced. He did two one-man shows: JFK, a One Man Show for PBS and, on stage, a national tour of David W. Rintels' play Clarence Darrow.

In 1985, Farrell partnered with film and television producer Marvin Minoff to create Farrell/Minoff Productions, a production company. Together, Farrell and Minoff produced numerous television movies. In 1986, the company had signed a deal with The Walt Disney Studios wherein the Farrell/Minoff company would develop motion pictures and television properties.

Farrell and Minoff executive produced Dominick and Eugene, a 1988 Orion Pictures film that earned actor Tom Hulce a Golden Globe nomination for best actor. The pair also produced 1998's Patch Adams starring Robin Williams. Farrell and Minoff's partnership lasted more than 25 years until Minoff's death in November 2009.

Providence (1999–2002)
In 1999, Farrell was given the part of veterinarian Jim Hansen, the father of the lead character Dr. Sydney Hansen, portrayed by Melina Kanakaredes, on the NBC-TV melodrama series Providence. In his portrayal of Sydney's father, Farrell played opposite Concetta Tomei, who portrayed his wife, Lynda Hansen. Tomei's character died during the first episode of the series, but continued to appear as a ghost/memory in vignettes of later episodes. Farrell appeared in 64 of the 96 episodes.

He appeared as Milton Lang, the father of Victor Lang (John Slattery), husband of Gabrielle Solis (Eva Longoria) on Desperate Housewives (2007–08).

He was seen in the season 10 episode "Persona" of Law & Order: Special Victims Unit. He appeared as the character Fred Jones in the season 8 episode "Hunteri Heroici" of Supernatural.  In 2014 he was a supporting cast member on the Sundance TV Network criminal drama series The Red Road. He portrayed Lee Miglin, a real estate baron who fell victim to serial killer Andrew Cunanan, in FX's anthology series American Crime Story: The Assassination of Gianni Versace. Most recently, he appeared in NCIS, playing the role of Judge Miles Deakin in the episode "Judge, Jury..." and "...and Executioner."

Activism

Even before he was well known, Farrell was an activist for many political and social causes. He was co-chair of the California Human Rights Watch for 10 years, was on the Board of Advisors of the original Cult Awareness Network, and has been president of Death Penalty Focus for more than 10 years, being the first person to be awarded its Human Rights Award, subsequently named after him in 2006.  He received PETA's Humanitarian Award in 2001, and narrated a public service campaign for them about animal abuse.

In 1985, Farrell was in Central America, helping refugees from the civil war in El Salvador. A guerrilla commander, Nidia Diaz, had been taken prisoner. She needed surgery, but no Salvadoran doctor would help her, so Medical Aid for El Salvador recruited a foreign doctor. Farrell was present as an observer for Amnesty International but was, in his words, "shanghaied into assisting with the surgery" when the doctor said his help was needed. The in-prison surgery was successful and Diaz went on to be one of the signatories of the Chapultepec Peace Accords, the peace treaty ending the war.

Farrell has been active in the Screen Actors Guild. In 2002 he was elected first vice president of the Guild in Los Angeles and served in the post for three years.

In 2006, Farrell appeared with Jello Biafra and Keith Gordon in the documentary Whose War?, examining the U.S. role in the Iraq War. He also served on the advisory board of the Military Religious Freedom Foundation.

In 2014, Farrell workshopped a play by George Shea which brought Dr. Charles David Keeling and his scientific work on atmospheric  emissions to life.

In 2016, after the US presidential election of Donald Trump, Farrell appeared in a commercial to urge Republican electors to block Trump from becoming president by having 37 electors change their vote in the Electoral College from Trump to John Kasich.

Publications

Farrell wrote an autobiography, Just Call Me Mike: A Journey to Actor and Activist (Akashic Books), published in 2007. The book covers his working-class childhood in West Hollywood, his break into show business, his personal life, and his increasing involvement in politics and the human rights movement in the United States, Cambodia, and Latin America. His second book, Of Mule and Man (2009, Akashic Books), is a journal of his five-week, 9,000-mile drive around the U.S. to promote the paperback edition of his first book.

Personal life
In August 1963, Farrell married actress Judy Hayden, who was working as a high school English and drama teacher in Laguna Beach, California. They were separated in 1980 and divorced in 1983. They have two children, Michael and Erin. On M*A*S*H, Hunnicutt's daughter also was named Erin. Also on M*A*S*H, in the episode "The Colonel's Horse" (season 5, episode 12), Hunnicutt's father-in-law is Floyd Hayden, Hayden being the maiden name of Judy, Farrell's wife. Judy Farrell also acted on M*A*S*H from 1976 to 1983 as Nurse Able.

On December 31, 1984, he married actress Shelley Fabares.

At the start of M*A*S*H'''s seventh season, Farrell grew a Walrus moustache for the B.J. Hunnicutt character even though such a moustache below the upper lip was then as now a clear violation of Army uniform guidelines, especially when left untrimmed. The normally clean-shaven Farrell grew it out for the character, as well as fashion trends at the time made the moustache in general popular for the first time since the beginning of the 20th century due in part due to fellow actors such as Burt Reynolds and Tom Selleck, as well as The Mustache Gang of the Oakland Athletics of Major League Baseball. While Farrell would retain the moustache for the B.J. character for the rest of the series and saw a rise in acting jobs because of it, Farrell himself quickly grew tired of it and didn't want to be typecast with "B.J.-like roles" for the rest of his career. Farrell would shave it off immediately after the series ended, returning to a clean-shaven look afterwards.

Selected filmography

 1963 McHale's Navy (TV series) (Episode "Washing Machine Charlie") as The Gunner
 1963 Captain Newman, M.D. as Patient (uncredited)
 1966 The Year of 53 Weeks as Captain Kendall (government film)
 1966 Combat! (TV series) (Episode "The Bankroll") as Doctor
 1967 The Monkees (TV series) (Episode "Monkees Chow Mein”) as Agent Modell
 1967 The Graduate as Bellhop In The Lobby (uncredited)
 1968 Countdown as Houston Engineer (uncredited)
 1968 Panic in the City as Dick Blaine
 1968 Targets as Man In Phonebooth
 1968 Dayton's Devils as Naval Officer
 1969 Worthy to Stand as Fred Washburn
 1972 Bonanza (TV series) (Episode "The Hidden Enemy") as Dr. Wills
 1972 Doomsday Machine (television film) as 1st Reporter
 1972 The Longest Night (television film) as Wills
 1973 She Cried Murder (television film) as Detective Walter Stepanic
 1973 Banacek (TV series) (Episode "The Greatest Collection Of Them All") as Jason Trotter
 1974 The Six Million Dollar Man (TV series) (Episode "The Pioneers") as David Tate 
 1974 The Questor Tapes (television film) as Jerry Robinson
 1974 Live Again, Die Again (television film) as James Carmichael
 1975 Ladies of the Corridor (television film) as Paul Osgood
1975-83 M*A*S*H (TV series) as B.J. Hunnicutt
 1976 McNaughton's Daughter (television film) as Colin Pierce
 1978 Battered (television film) as Michael Hawks
 1979 Sex and the Single Parent (television film) as George
 1979 Letters From Frank (television film) as Richard Miller
 1981 The Body Human: Becoming A Man (TV documentary) Host
 1980 Father Damien: The Leper Priest (television film) as Robertson
 1982 Prime Suspect (television film) as Frank Steplin
 1983 Memorial Day (television film) as Matt Walker
 1983 Choices of the Heart (television film) as Ambassador Robert E. White
 1984 J.F.K.: A One-Man Show (television film) as John F. Kennedy
 1985 Private Sessions (television film) as Dr. Joe Braden
 1986 Vanishing Act (television film) as Harry Kenyon
 1987 A Deadly Silence (television film) as Attorney Gianelli
 1989 Incident at Dark River (television film) as Tim McFall
 1990 The Price of the Bride (television film) as Joe Roth
 1990 Lockdown as Prentis
 1991 The Whereabouts of Jenny (television film) as Van Zandt
 1991 Silent Movie (television film) as Detective Paul Trella
 1994 Hart to Hart: Old Friends Never Die (television film) as Frank Crane
 1994 Matlock (TV series) (Episode "The Trial") as Judge Bennett
 1996 Vows of Deception (television film) as Clay Spencer
 1996 Sins of the Mind (television film) as William
 1996-99 Superman: The Animated Series as Jonathan Kent (voice)
 1997 The Killers Within as Congressman Clayton
1999-03 Providence (TV series) as Jim Hansen
 2003 The Crooked E: The Unshredded Truth About Enron (television film) as Kenneth Lay
 2003 Justice League (TV series) (Episode "Comfort and Joy") as Jonathan Kent (voice)
 2004 The Clinic (television film) as Dr. Cyrus Gachet
 2004 Justice League Unlimited (TV series) (Episode "For the Man Who Has Everything") as Jonathan Kent, Brainiac (voice)
 2005 Locusts (television film) as Lyle Rierdon
 2007 Out at the Wedding (television film) as Father of the Bride
 2008 Law & Order Special Victims Unit (TV series) as Jonah Malcolm
 2009 Ghost Whisperer (TV series) as William Jet
 2012 Supernatural (TV series) as Fred Jones
 2014-15 The Red Road (TV series) as David Rogers
 2018 The Assassination of Gianni Versace: American Crime Story (TV series) (Episodes "A Random Killing", "Descent") as Lee Miglin
 2019 NCIS (TV series) (Episodes "Judge, Jury...", “and Executioner”) as Judge Miles Deakin

References

External links

 (archived 2016)

Death Penalty Focus
Audio interview of Mike Farrell by Stephanie Miller about the Guantanamo Bay play on The Stephanie Miller Show''
Recording of Mike Farrell talking about his book and activities from Sacramento, CA on September 28, 2008

1939 births
Living people
American anti–death penalty activists
Film producers from California
American male television actors
American male voice actors
Hollywood High School alumni
Male actors from Hollywood, Los Angeles
Male actors from Saint Paul, Minnesota
Military personnel from Minnesota
United States Marines
Activists from California
Film producers from Minnesota